Mladen Kuchev (born 29 January 1947) is a Bulgarian former weightlifter who competed in the 1968 Summer Olympics and in the 1972 Summer Olympics.

References

1947 births
Living people
Bulgarian male weightlifters
Olympic weightlifters of Bulgaria
Weightlifters at the 1968 Summer Olympics
Weightlifters at the 1972 Summer Olympics
Olympic silver medalists for Bulgaria
Olympic medalists in weightlifting
People from Pleven Province
Medalists at the 1972 Summer Olympics
20th-century Bulgarian people
21st-century Bulgarian people